Potheri railway station is one of the railway stations of the Chennai Beach–Chengalpattu section of the Chennai Suburban Railway Network. It serves the neighbourhood of Potheri, a suburb of Chennai. The station also serves the Livestock Research Station, Kattupakkam and SRM Institute of Science and Technology.

History

The lines at the station were electrified on 9 January 1965, with the electrification of the Tambaram—Chengalpattu section.

See also

 Chennai Suburban Railway

References

External links
 Potheri railway station at IndiaRailInfo.com

 

Stations of Chennai Suburban Railway
 Railway stations in Kanchipuram district